The Sagebrush School was the literary movement written primarily by men of Nevada. The sagebrush shrub is prevalent in the state. It was a broad-based movement as it included various literary genres such as drama, essays, fiction, history, humor, journalism, memoirs, and poetry.  The name Sagebrush School was coined by Ella Sterling Mighels, who stated:

Sagebrush school? Why not? Nothing in all our Western literature so distinctly savors of the soil as the characteristic books written by the men of Nevada and that interior part of the State where the sagebrush grows.

The roots of the movement were in the American Old West. The Sagebrush School was the main contributor to American literature from Nevada's mining frontier during the period of 1859 to 1914. There were several characteristics of this movement that distinguished it from others, such as literary talent; these authors were known to be intelligent and accomplished writers. The style included hoaxes, wit, audacity, or an irreverent attitude. The inspiration for the movement began with Joseph T. Goodman of the Virginia City, Nevada Territory's Territorial Enterprise. The most notable of the Sagebrush School writers, and a Territorial Enterprise journalist, was Mark Twain. In 2009, the Sagebrush School was inducted into the Nevada Writers Hall of Fame.

Writers
 Samuel Clemens (Mark Twain)
 Rollin M. Daggett
 Samuel Post Davis
 Alfred R. Doten
 Thomas Fitch
 James W. Gally
 Joseph T. Goodman
 Charles Carroll Goodwin
 Fred H. Hart
  Sarah Winnemucca Hopkins
 Denis E. McCarthy
 Arthur McEwen
 Henry Rust Mighels
 John Franklin Swift
 James William Emery Townsend
 Joseph Wasson
 William Wright (Dan DeQuille)

Anthologies
 Basso, Dave, Sagebrush Chronicles (1971)
 Witschi, Nicolas S. (ed.), The Sagebrush Anthology: Literature from the Silver Age of the Old West (2006)

References

 
American literary movements
Nevada in fiction
American frontier
History of literature in the United States
Nevada culture